Wolcott may refer to:

Places in the United States
Wolcott, Colorado
Wolcott, Connecticut
Wolcott, Indiana
Wolcott, Kansas
Wolcott, New York
Wolcott (village), New York
Wolcott, Vermont
Wolcott Junction, Wyoming
Fort Wolcott (Rhode Island)

People
Alexander S. Wolcott, Connecticut inventor
Alexander Wolcott, Connecticut politician
Edward O. Wolcott, Colorado Senator
Frank Wolcott, Union Army officer, rancher, and old west law man and outlaw
F. S. Wolcott, American owner of the Rabbit's Foot traveling vaudeville company
George Norton Wolcott, American entomologist
Jackie Wolcott, American diplomat
James Wolcott, American writer and critic
Jesse P. Wolcott, U.S. Representative from Michigan
Josiah O. Wolcott, U.S. Senator from Delaware
Marion Post Wolcott, U.S. photographer for the Farm Security Administration
Oliver Wolcott, one of the signers of the United States Declaration of Independence
Oliver Wolcott Jr., 2nd United States Secretary of the Treasury and Governor of Connecticut
Roger Wolcott (Massachusetts politician), Governor of Massachusetts
Roger Wolcott (Connecticut politician), Governor of Connecticut

Ships
, more than one ship of the United States Revenue-Marine and United States Revenue Cutter Service

See also
 Justice Wolcott (disambiguation)